The Two of Us is a 1967 French comedy-drama film. It starred Michel Simon, Charles Denner and Alain Cohen, and was the first film Claude Berri directed. The film was entered into the 17th Berlin International Film Festival, where Michel Simon won the Silver Bear for Best Actor award.

Plot 
Claude (Alain Cohen) is an 8-year-old Jewish boy living in France during the Nazi occupation. To reduce the chance that he would be sent to Auschwitz or a similar fate, his parents send him to live with a farm family, the elderly parents of Catholic friends of his parents. (In reality, many French urban Jews made similar choices for their children.) The elderly couple honestly think that the boy has been sent to live with them because Paris is dangerous; it never crosses their mind that Claude is a Jew.

Claude is given a new last name (Longuet), is taught a few things about Catholic ritual, such as the Lord's Prayer, and most important, is told to never let anyone see his circumcised penis (in France, generally only Jews and Muslims are circumcised); thus Claude's strange prudishness at bath time. Otherwise, he plays well the part of boy grateful to be safe in the countryside, building a warm relationship with Pépé (played by veteran character actor Michel Simon) and Mémé (Luce Fabiole), his simple and likeable surrogate grandparents. They form a strong and mutually affectionate bond.

There is a fly in the ointment; Claude's willing protectors share in the prejudices common to their time and place, anti-Semitism included. They believe World War II to be the fault of Jews, communists, Freemasons, and worst of all, the British who can never be trusted. Pépé considers Marshal Philippe Pétain, the puppet leader ruling France under Germany's thumb, a hero. Pépé attempts to pass his anti-Semitic convictions on to the boy. The boy plays along with the old man, teasing him about his prejudices but never revealing the truth about himself.

Cast
 Michel Simon - Pépé
 Alain Cohen - Claude
 Charles Denner - Claude's Father
 Luce Fabiole - Mémé
 Roger Carel - Victor
 Paul Préboist - Maxime
 Jacqueline Rouillard - Teacher
 Aline Bertrand - Raymonde
 Sylvine Delannoy - Suzanne

Home media
A DVD (region 1) was released in 2007.

References

Further reading
 Ebert's four-star review.

External links 

The Two of Us: War and Peace an essay by David Sterritt at the Criterion Collection

1967 films
1967 comedy-drama films
French World War II films
French black-and-white films
Films scored by Georges Delerue
Films directed by Claude Berri
Films about old age
Films with screenplays by Claude Berri
Films with screenplays by Gérard Brach
French comedy-drama films
1960s French films